Christopher Michael Holt (born September 18, 1971) is a former pitcher for the Houston Astros (1996–1997 and 1999–2000) and Detroit Tigers (2001). He was a member of the Astros' National League Central Division champions in 1997 and 1999.

Holt made his major league debut in 1996, appearing in 4 games. The following season, he was 8-12 with a career low 3.52 ERA in  innings. He missed the 1998 season due to injury and came back in 1999. Holt was not as he had pitched in his rookie season, posting a record of 5-13 in 32 games (26 starts). On April 28, 2000, he tossed a one-hitter against the Milwaukee Brewers. On the 2000 season, Holt tied a career high in wins with 8 but posted an ERA of 5.35 while losing 16 games. He also struck out a career high 136. For the 2000 season, Holt signed a one-year deal with the Detroit Tigers. Holt's ineffectiveness continued as he posted a career worst ERA of 5.77 in 30 games (22 starts).  

Following his major league career, he pitched two seasons in Japan for the Yokohama BayStars.

References

External links 
, or Retrosheet, or Baseball Reference (Minor, Independent and Japanese Leagues), or Pelota Binaria (Venezuelan Winter League)

1971 births
Living people
American expatriate baseball players in Japan
Auburn Astros players
Baseball players from Dallas
Chillicothe Paints players
Colorado Springs Sky Sox players
Detroit Tigers players
Houston Astros players
Jackson Generals (Texas League) players
Kissimmee Cobras players
Major League Baseball pitchers
Navarro Bulldogs baseball players
Navegantes del Magallanes players
American expatriate baseball players in Venezuela
Quad Cities River Bandits players
Tucson Toros players
Yokohama BayStars players